Tianping Mountain (literally Flat Heaven Mountain), also called Baiyun Mountain or Ci Mountain, is a mountain located in southwestern Suzhou, Jiangsu, China. Its elevation is about 201 meters. The mountain gained fame due to Fan Zhongyan, whose ancestors were buried there. And now, Fan Zhongyan Memorial has been established near the mountain. Tianping Mountain is also famous for its stone, spring and maple.

References

Mountains of Suzhou
Wuzhong District